Govedarica is a Serbian surname, derived from govedar, "cowboy". It may refer to:

Dejan Govedarica (b. 1969), Serbian footballer
Bato Govedarica (1928–2006), American basketball player

Serbian surnames
Occupational surnames